Valara (Malayalam: വാളറ)  is located in between Neriamangalam on the eastern border of the Ernakulam District and Adimali of Kochi - Madurai National Highway (NH-49). It is in Idukki district, Kerala, at a distance of 14 km from Adimali. The main attraction of this place is Valara waterfalls. Which is in the Deviyar river, a small river originating from western ghats, passing through Adimali Grama Panchayath. It is considered as one of the major waterfalls in Kerala state. The Thottiyar Hydro Electric project is the New project of KSEB. The Project proposed in the river Thottiyar (Deviyar), a tributary of river Periyar in Idukki District of Kerala State. The scheme envisages utilization of the water from a catchment area of 59 sq.km, and by diverting the water by constructing a weir across the river Thottiyar through an open cut channel, conveyance tunnel, penstock to generate electricity in a surface power house. The tail race water will be led to the same river through a tail race channel. Valara has chain of waterfalls surrounded by thick green forests. Cheeyappara Waterfall is nearby.

External links
 Things To Know about Valara Falls
 About Valara
 Valara on Wikimapia

Waterfalls of Idukki district